Admiral Robert Hilborn Falls,  (April 24, 1924 – November 6, 2009) was Chief of Defence Staff of the Canadian Forces from 1977 to 1980.

Military career
Falls first joined the Royal Canadian Air Force in 1942 as a pilot and later transferred to the Royal Canadian Navy after World War II. He served as commander of the Canadian Flotilla Atlantic, as Vice Chief of the Defence Staff from 1974 to 1977, as Chief of Defence Staff of the Canadian Forces from 1977 to 1980, and as Chairman of the NATO Military Committee from 1980 to 1983.

Falls later became president of the Canadian Centre for Arms Control and Disarmament (now the Canadian Council for International Peace and Security).

Awards and decorations
Falls' personal awards and decorations received during his naval career include the following:

 He was a qualified RCAF Pilot and as such wore the Royal Canadian Forces Pilot Wings

References

|-

1924 births
2009 deaths
Chiefs of the Defence Staff (Canada)
Canadian admirals
People from Welland
Royal Canadian Air Force personnel of World War II
NATO military personnel
Canadian World War II pilots
Canadian military personnel from Ontario